Marc Ferro (24 December 1924 – 21 April 2021) was a French historian.

Life and career
Ferro worked on early twentieth-century European history, specialising in the history of Russia and the USSR, as well as the history of cinema.

His Ukrainian-Jewish mother was murdered during the Holocaust.

He was Director of Studies in Social Sciences at the École des hautes études en sciences sociales. He was a co-director of the French review Annales and co-editor of the Journal of Contemporary History.

He also directed and presented  television documentaries on the rise of the Nazis, Lenin and the Russian revolution and on the representation of history in cinema.

Ferro died from COVID-19 complications in Maisons-Laffitte in April 2021, at the age of 96.

Honours and awards

Honours
 Knight of the Legion of Honour 
 Officier of the National Order of Merit
 Officer of the Ordre des Palmes académiques
 Knight of the Ordre des Arts et des Lettres

Awards
 City of Paris History Film Prize (France, 1975)
 Prize Clio (France, 1988)
 Europe's Historical Prize (1994)
 Peace Prize (France, 2007)
 Prize Saint-Simon (France, 2011)

Honorary degrees
 Moscow State University
 Bordeaux Montaigne University
 University of Chile.

Bibliography
La Révolution de 1917, Paris, Aubier Éditions Montaigne, 1967 [English translation: The Russian revolution of February 1917, translated by J.L. Richards, Englewood Cliffs, New Jersey: Prentice-Hall, 1972]
La Révolution de 1917, Paris, Aubier Éditions Montaigne, 1967 [English translation: The Russian revolution of February 1917, translated by J.L. Richards, notes and bibliography translated by Nicole Stone, London: Routledge & Kegan Paul, 1972]
La Révolution de 1917 T.2: Octobre: Naissance D'une société, Paris, Aubier Éditions Montaigne, 1967 (reprinted in 1976, then in 1997 at Albin Michel) [English translation: October 1917: a social history of the Russian revolution , translated by Norman Stone, London: Routledge & Kegan Paul, 1980]
La Grande Guerre, 1914-1918, Paris, Gallimard, 1968 (reprinted 1987) [English translation: The Great War, 1914-1918, 1972]
Cinéma et Histoire, Paris, Denoël, 1976 (réédité chez Gallimard en 1993) [English translation: Cinema and history, translated by Naomi Greene, 1988]
L'Occident devant la révolution soviétique, Brussels, Complexe, 1980 
Suez, Brussels, Complexe, 1981
The Use and Abuse of History, Or, How the Past is Taught, 1981
Comment on raconte l'histoire aux enfants à travers le monde, Paris, Payot, 1983 
L'Histoire sous surveillance : science et conscience de l'histoire, Paris, Calmann-Lévy, 1985 (reedited in 1987 by Gallimard)
Pétain, Paris, Fayard, 1987 (reedited in 1993 et 1994)
Les Origines de la Perestroïka, Paris, Ramsay, 1990
Nicolas II, Payot, Paris, 1991
Questions sur la Deuxième Guerre mondiale, Paris, Casterman, 1993
Histoire des colonisations, des conquêtes aux indépendances (XIIIe-XXe siècle), Paris, Le Seuil, 1994
L'internationale, Paris, Editions Noêsis, 1996 
Que transmettre à nos enfants (with Philippe Jammet), Paris, Le Seuil, 2000 
Les Tabous de l'histoire, Paris, Nil, 2002 
Le Livre noir du colonialisme (director), Paris, Robert Laffont, 2003.  
Histoire de France, France Loisirs, 2002 
Le choc de l'Islam, Paris, Odile Jacob, 2003 
Le Cinéma, une vision de l'histoire, Paris, Le Chêne, 2003 
Les Tabous de L'Histoire, Pocket vol. 11949, NiL Éditions, Paris, 2004 
Les individus face aux crises du XXe siècle : L'Histoire anonyme, Paris, Odile Jacob, 2005
Le ressentiment dans l' histoire. Odile Jacob, 2007. English (2010): Resentment in History,  (paperback)
Ils étaient sept hommes en guerre : Histoire parallèle, Robert Laffont, Paris, 2007.
 Autobiographie intellectuelle, Paris, Perrin, 2011
 La Vérité sur la tragédie des Romanov, Paris, Taillandier, 2012.
 Les Russes, l'esprit d'un peuple , Paris, Taillandier, 2017.
 L'Entrée dans la vie, Paris, Tallandier, 2020

References

1924 births
2021 deaths
20th-century French historians
21st-century French historians
French film historians
French male writers
French people of Ukrainian-Jewish descent
Historians of Europe
Historians of Vichy France
Academic staff of the School for Advanced Studies in the Social Sciences
Chevaliers of the Légion d'honneur
Officers of the Ordre national du Mérite
Officiers of the Ordre des Palmes Académiques
Chevaliers of the Ordre des Arts et des Lettres
Writers from Paris
Deaths from the COVID-19 pandemic in France